Nannambikkai is a 1956 Indian Tamil-language film directed by K. Vembu and Charlie. The film stars N. S. Krishnan and T. A. Mathuram. It was released on 31 August 1956.

Plot

Cast 
List adapted from the database of Film News Anandan

Male cast
N. S. Krishnan
N. N. Kannappa
T. S. Balaiah
T. K. Balachandran
Female cast
T. A. Mathuram
Pandari Bai
Mynavathi
E. V. Saroja

Production 
The film was produced by K. Vembu who also directed the film together with Charlie. S. Ramanathan and M. S. Kannan wrote the screenplay and dialogues. K. Prabhakar was in charge of cinematography while Pal G. Yadav handled the editing. Art direction was by Jayavanth while choreography was done by R. K. Raj. Still photography was by Venkatachari and the film was shot and processed at Film Centre, Madras.

Soundtrack 
Music was composed by S. V. Venkatraman while the lyrics were penned by S. D. S. Yogi, Kambadasan, Adhimoolam, Kavi Lakshmanadas and Clown Sundaram. A song by Kavimani Desigavinayagam Pillai was included in the film.

Reception 
The Indian Express wrote, "Situations in the story are so marshalled as to preserve the concept of the poetic justice and such it is bound to fare well as an entertainer." Kanthan of Kalki appreciated Krishnan and Madhuram's comedy.

References

External links 

1950s Tamil-language films
Films scored by S. V. Venkatraman
Indian black-and-white films